Democratic Regroupment of Kolda (in French: Regroupement démocratique de Kolda) was a political party in Kolda, Senegal. It existed around 1960.

Sources
Nzouankeu, Jacques Mariel. Les partis politiques sénégalais. Dakar: Editions Clairafrique, 1984.

Political parties in Senegal